Pohlidium is a genus of Panamanian plants in the grass family. The only known species is Pohlidium petiolatum, native to Coclé Province in central Panamá.

References

Panicoideae
Monotypic Poaceae genera
Endemic flora of Panama